The following is a list of French wines that were entitled to use the designation Vin Délimité de Qualité Supérieure (VDQS) on their label, which was the second highest category out of four.

The VDQS category was abolished by December 31, 2011, when the number of categories for French wine were reduced four to three as part of a general overhaul of the European Union-wide classification of wine. Then-existing VDQS wines were either promoted to AOC/AOP status or demoted to Vin de pays/IGP status.

Classification sorted in VDQS / region

{|class="wikitable sortable" style="text-align:left"
|----- bgcolor="#CCDDEE"
! VDQS
! Wine region
! Comments
|----- bgcolor="#DDEEFF"
| Châteaumeillant || Loire || VDQS in 1965, aims for AOC status
|----- bgcolor="#DDEEFF"
| Coteaux d'Ancenis || Loire || VDQS in 1973, aims for AOC status
|----- bgcolor="#DDEEFF"
| Coteaux du Quercy || South West France || VDQS in 1999, aims for AOC status
|----- bgcolor="#DDEEFF"
| Côtes d'Auvergne || Loire  || VDQS in 1977, aims for AOC status
|----- bgcolor="#DDEEFF"
| Côtes de Millau || South West France || VDQS in 1994, aims for AOC status under the name Millau
|----- bgcolor="#DDEEFF"
| Côtes du Brulhois || South West France || VDQS in 1984, aims for AOC status under the name Brulhois
|----- bgcolor="#DDEEFF"
| Fiefs vendéens || Loire || VDQS in 1984
|----- bgcolor="#DDEEFF"
| Gros Plant du Pays nantais || Loire || VDQS in 1954, previously also written only as Gros Plant. Aims either for IGP or AOC status.
|----- bgcolor="#DDEEFF"
| Haut Poitou || Loire || VDQS in 1970, aims for AOC status
|----- bgcolor="#DDEEFF"
| Moselle || Lorraine || VDQS in 1951, aims for AOC status
|----- bgcolor="#DDEEFF"
| Saint-Mont || South West France || VDQS in 1981, could previously also be called Côtes de Saint-Mont, but Saint-Mont is the only name since 2007. Aims for AOC status.
|----- bgcolor="#DDEEFF"
| Saint-Sardos || South West France || VDQS in 2005, aims for AOC status
|----- bgcolor="#DDEEFF"
| Tursan || South West France || VDQS in 1958, aims for AOC status AOC status in 2011
|----- bgcolor="#DDEEFF"
| Vins du Thouarsais || Loire || VDQS in 1966, will not aim for AOC status and will presumably become part of a larger VDP/IGP designation.
|----- bgcolor="#DDEEFF"
| Vins d'Entraygues et du Fel || South West France || VDQS in 1965, aims for AOC status under the name Entraygues et Le Fel
|----- bgcolor="#DDEEFF"
| Vins d'Estaing || South West France || VDQS in 1965, aims for AOC status under the name Estaing
|----- bgcolor="#DDEEFF"
| Vins de Lavilledieu || South West France || VDQS in 1954, aims for AOC status under the name Lavilledieu
|----- bgcolor="#DDEEFF"
|}

Former VDQS wines elevated to full AOC status 
{|class="wikitable sortable" style="text-align:left"
|----- bgcolor="#CCDDEE"
! VDQS
! Wine region
! Comments
|-
| Béarn || South West France || VDQS in 1951, AOC in 1975
|-
| Bugey || Bugey || VDQS in 1958, AOC in 2009
|-
| Cabardès or Côtes du Cabardès et de l'Orbiel || Languedoc || AOC in 1999 under the sole name Cabardès
|-
| Cheverny || Loire || VDQS in 1973, AOC in 1993
|-
| Costières du Gard || Languedoc || AOC in 1986, renamed to Costières de Nîmes in 1989, and in 2004 reassigned to the Rhône region
|-
| Coteaux d'Ajaccio || Corsica || VDQS in 1971, AOC in 1976 as part of Corse or Vin du Corse, separate AOC in 1984 
|-
| Coteaux du Giennois || Loire || VDQS 1954, AOC in 1998
|-
| Coteaux du Lyonnais || Lyonnais || VDQS in 1952 (could also be called Vins du Lyonnais), AOC in 1984
|-
| Coteaux du Vendômois || Loire || VDQS in 1968, AOC in 2001
|-
| Côtes de Buzet || South West France || VDQS in 1953, AOC in 1973, renamed to Buzet in 1986
|-
| Côtes du Forez || Burgundy || AOC in 2000
|-
| Côtes du Marmandais || South West France || VDQS in 1975, AOC in 1990
|-
| Côtes de la Malepère || Languedoc || VDQS in 1983, AOC in 2007
|-
| Côtes de Toul || Lorraine || AOC in 1998
|-
| Côtes du Vivarais || Rhône || VDQS in 1962, AOC in 1999
|-
| Orléans || Loire || Renamed from Vins de l'Orléanais to Orléans in 2002, AOC in 2006
|-
| Orléans-Cléry || Loire || Created in 2002, AOC in 2006
|-
| Patrimonio || Corsica || VDQS in 1968, AOC in 1976 as part of Corse or Vin du Corse, separate AOC in 1984
|-
| Roussette du Bugey || Bugey || VDQS in 1958, AOC in 2009
|-
| Saint-Pourçain || Loire || VDQS in 1951 under the name Vins de Saint-Pourçain sur Sioule, renamed to Saint-Pourçain in 1982, AOC in 2009
|-
| Sartène || Corsica || VDQS in 1968, could also be called Vin du Sartenais, AOC in 1976 as part of Corse or Vin du Corse
|-
| Sauvignon de Saint-Bris || Burgundy || AOC in 2003 under the name Saint-Bris
|-
| Valençay || Loire || VDQS in 1970, AOC in 2004
|-
| Vin de Marcillac || South West France || VDQS in 1965, AOC in 1990 under the name Marcillac
|}

See also
 French wine
 Vin Délimité de Qualité Supérieure
 List of Appellation d'Origine Contrôlée wines

References
 Arrêté du 19 juillet 2004 relatif à la composition des comités régionaux vins et eaux-de-vie de l'Institut national des appellations d'origine 
 Europa.eu: Wine sector: List of quality wines produced in specified regions

French wine AOCs
Appellations